The men's 1 km time trial at the UEC European Track Championships was first competed in 2014 in Guadeloupe, France.

Medalists

References

 
Men's 1 km time trial
Men's time trial (track cycling)